Harry Clayton Wilson (January 1, 1876 – April 15, 1929) was an American professional baseball player. He played in one game as a catcher for the Baltimore Orioles during the 1898 season. He was born in Baltimore, Maryland.

References

External links

1876 births
1929 deaths
19th-century baseball players
Major League Baseball catchers
Baltimore Orioles (NL) players
Paterson Silk Weavers players
Toronto Canucks players
London Cockneys players
Hartford Indians players
Bristol Bellmakers players
Waterbury Rough Riders players
New London Whalers players
Norwich Witches players
Baseball players from Baltimore